Strumaria massoniella is a species of flowering plant in the family Amaryllidaceae, native to the Cape Provinces of South Africa. It was first described in 1985 as Gemmaria massoniella. Its bulb is solitary. Like other members of the genus Strumaria it has star-shaped flowers.

References

massoniella
Flora of the Cape Provinces
Plants described in 1985